Mendip Vale is the western terminus of the East Somerset Railway.

Services

All trains terminate at Mendip Vale, with a 5-10 minute wait while the engine runs round to change ends.

Facilities

Visitors are encouraged to leave the train and watch the engine run round. A footpath has been constructed between the platform and Maesdown Road, to allow public access to the station.

References

External links
East Somerset Railway Website

Heritage railway stations in Somerset
Mendip Hills
Railway stations built for UK heritage railways